Gangak (also Romanized as Gongak; also known as Kūīngak) is a village in Khararud Rural District, in the Central District of Khodabandeh County, Zanjan Province, Iran. At the 2006 census, its population was 431, in 94 families.

References 

Populated places in Khodabandeh County